This is a list of episodes for the second season (1977) of the NBC television series Quincy, M.E..

The first two seasons of this series were released on DVD together in a single box set by Universal Home Video.

Episodes

References

External links
 

1977 American television seasons